Kevin Lynn Roberson (born January 29, 1968 in Decatur, Illinois) is a former professional baseball player. He was an outfielder. When Roberson hit a home run, broadcaster Harry Caray would declare, "They're dancing in the streets in Decatur, Illinois!"

References

External links

1968 births
Living people
African-American baseball players
Algodoneros de Torreón players
American expatriate baseball players in Canada
American expatriate baseball players in Mexico
Baseball players from Illinois
Cafeteros de Córdoba players
Calgary Cannons players
Charleston Wheelers players
Charlotte Knights players
Chicago Cubs players
Iowa Cubs players
Joliet JackHammers players
Parkland Cobras baseball players
Lincoln Saltdogs players
Major League Baseball right fielders
Mexican League baseball outfielders
New York Mets players
New York Mets scouts
Norfolk Tides players
Phoenix Firebirds players
St. Paul Saints players
Salt Lake Buzz players
Sportspeople from Decatur, Illinois
Sultanes de Monterrey players
Tacoma Rainiers players
Tecolotes de los Dos Laredos players
Winston-Salem Spirits players
Wytheville Cubs players
21st-century African-American people
20th-century African-American sportspeople